La Genête is a commune in the Saône-et-Loire department in the region of Bourgogne-Franche-Comté in eastern France.

Geography
The Sâne Vive forms most of the commune's northern and northwestern borders, then flows into the Seille, which forms its western border.

See also
Communes of the Saône-et-Loire department

References

Communes of Saône-et-Loire